The Miracle of the Holy Belt was completed by Theodore Poulakis.  He was a Greek painter originally from the village of Chania, Crete.  He was associated with the Cretan School.  He eventually migrated to the Ionian Islands.  He was a member of the Heptanese School.  He settled on the island of Corfu.  He was a famous teacher.  He signed a six-year contract to teach painting to Marinos Damistras son Tzorzi.  The contract stipulated that his student had to follow him to Venice. Poulakis frequently traveled all over the Venetian Empire.  During one period of his life, he stayed in Venice for over 13 years.  He was very active within the painting community.  He was also involved with the prestigious quarantia council.  One hundred thirty of his work survived.

The Girdle of Thomas also referred to as the miracle of the holy belt is a sacred relic located at Prato Cathedral in Tuscany, Italy.  According to legend, a knotted textile cord fell from the heavens to Saint Thomas the Apostle around the time of the Assumption of Mary. Saint Thomas missed the post-resurrection of the holy spirit and he was doubting the event.  He also missed the Assumption of Mary and the Virgin sent the Girdle of Thomas as proof to doubting Thomas.  Poulaki depicted the holy belt in his painting.  Poulaki's paintings were heavily influenced by French and Flemish engravings circulating the Venetian Empire.  Most of the Greek community embraced Jan Sadeler I.  Poulaki's works such as The Fall of Man  and In Thee Rejoiceth were influenced by Étienne Delaune.  His work began to reflect French and Flemish attributes not reflective of the maniera greca or Venetian painting.  The artist absorbed the stylistic characteristic of Flemish and French painting. The Miracle of the Holy Belt is an example of the artist's knowledge of both styles.  He also integrated Cretan Renaissance painting.  The work of art is housed at the Benaki Museum.

Description
The work of art is made of egg tempera on wood.  The height is 39.7 cm (15.6 in) and the width is 49.5 cm (19.4 in).  The orientation of the painting illustrates the artist's comfort with painting works similar to French and Flemish engravings.  He used the same method in his  The Nativity of Christ.  The artist also reveals his knowledge of Michael Damaskinos's tiled floors.  An example of floor tiling is in his The Last Supper .  The style was also adopted by Greek painter Emmanuel Tzanes in his portrayal of Saint Mark.  The crowned Virgin is the central figure.  She is pregnant.  Joseph is also crowned.  He is kneeling before her.  Two children hold the traditional religious thymiaterion and a candle.  Three religious figures are present, a priest is handing the Virgin Mary the holy belt. Saint Thomas the Apostle bows before the Virgin and his leg appears.  The artist attempts to reveal human naturalism. The room is lavishly ornamented with gold.  The painting features exuberant patterns, radiant colors, and ostentatious costumes.  The artist creates a three-dimensional scene filled with majestic splendor.  A soldier peaks into a doorway inlaid with ancient Greek columns.  The soldier is dressed in lavish attire.  Two other figures appear to our right outside of a second doorway.  Multiple structures emerge in the background beneath a beautiful blue sky.  On the ceiling of the room, the Virgin appears a second time within a celestial aura holding the infant Jesus.  The aura also features a three-dimensional layer of clouds.  The different objects spread around the room demonstrate the artist's attempt to create a multi-dimensional environment.

Gallery

See also
Holy Girdle
Mérode Altarpiece

References

Bibliography

"Cassidy (1991)": Cassidy, Brendan, "A Relic, Some Pictures and the Mothers of Florence in the Late Fourteenth Century", Gesta, Vol. 30, No. 2 (1991), pp. 91–99, The University of Chicago Press on behalf of the International Center of Medieval Art, JSTOR

Rylands, Philip, "Palma Vecchio's 'Assumption of the Virgin'", The Burlington Magazine, Vol. 119, No. 889, (Apr., 1977), pp. 244–250, JSTOR

17th-century paintings
Paintings in Greece
Paintings of the Heptanese School